Lewis College of Business was a private, historically black college in Detroit, Michigan.   It was also the first and only historically black college in Michigan. Founded in 1928 by Violet T. Lewis, it specialized in business-related topics. The school closed in 2013. There are plans as of October 2021 to reopen the college with a focus on fashion design.

The school was the founding location of Gamma Phi Delta sorority, Eta Phi Beta sorority, and Tau Gamma Delta sorority.

References

External links
 Official website (archived in 2011)

Universities and colleges in Detroit
Business schools in Michigan
Midtown Detroit
Defunct private universities and colleges in Michigan
Educational institutions established in 1928
1928 establishments in Michigan
2013 disestablishments in Michigan
Unaccredited institutions of higher learning in the United States
Educational institutions disestablished in 2013